Hafedh Ben Sala (born 28 January 1950) is a Tunisian politician. He served as Minister of Justice in the cabinet of Prime Minister Mehdi Jomaa.

References 

Living people
1950 births
People from Moknine
21st-century Tunisian politicians
Government ministers of Tunisia
Justice ministers of Tunisia